Ludwig Trautmann (22 November 1885 – 24 January 1957) was a German stage and film actor. He appeared in more than 60 films between 1912 and 1953. He was a member of the jury at the 1st Berlin International Film Festival.

Selected filmography
 The Priest from Kirchfeld (1914)
 The Brown Beast (1914)
 The ABC of Love (1916)
 The Marriage of Luise Rohrbach (1917)
 Ferdinand Lassalle (1918)
 The Lodging House for Gentleman (1922)
 The Eleven Schill Officers (1932)
 Trenck (1932)
 The Hymn of Leuthen (1933)
 Today Is the Day (1933)

References

External links

1885 births
1957 deaths
German male film actors
German male silent film actors
Film people from Bavaria
People from Neustadt (Aisch)-Bad Windsheim
20th-century German male actors